Scinax elaeochroa, commonly known as the Sipurio snouted treefrog, or olive snouted treefrog, is a species of frog in the family Hylidae. It is found in the Caribbean lowlands of Nicaragua and Panama and in the Pacific lowlands of Costa Rica and Panama, with an isolated population in Colombia.

Description
The snout is protruding. The dorsum is yellowish, sometimes with a hint of green or light brown, and turns brilliant yellow in breeding males. There are usually some darker markings on the dorsum. The arms and legs are usually barred. The venter varies from cream to yellow to orange; the throat is usually yellow.

The vocal sac in breeding males is bright yellow-orange. The advertisement call is a series of short "waaks".

Habitat and conservation
The natural habitats of Scinax elaeochroa are humid lowland and lower premontane forests, occurring also in secondary and disturbed forest habitats. It is primarily a nocturnal species that breeds in temporary ponds during the wet season. Eggs are laid in ponds or on adjacent vegetation, and the tadpoles develop in the pond.

Though a common and somewhat adaptable species, Scinax elaeochrous is potentially threatened by deforestation.

References

elaeochroa
Amphibians of Colombia
Amphibians of Costa Rica
Amphibians of Nicaragua
Amphibians of Panama
Amphibians described in 1875
Taxa named by Edward Drinker Cope
Taxonomy articles created by Polbot